Collège Sturgeon Heights Collegiate is a dual-track and was recognized by the International Baccalaureate before it was phased out by AP, secondary school in Winnipeg, Manitoba. It is part of the St. James-Assiniboia School Division. In addition to AP, the school offers a French Immersion program, technical and vocational programs, and multiple fine arts programs.

History
The school came together as the amalgamation of Sturgeon Creek Collegiate and Collège Silver Heights Collegiate in 2007.

Notable alumni
Sharon Blady, politician
Jordan Herdman-Reed, professional Canadian football linebacker
Justin Herdman-Reed, professional Canadian football linebacker
Baxter Humby, Kickboxer

References

External links
 Home Page
 CSHC Lady Huskies - WWHSHL Team

High schools in Winnipeg
Educational institutions established in 2009
2009 establishments in Manitoba
International Baccalaureate schools in Manitoba
St. James, Winnipeg